Legend of the Mountain is a 1979 Taiwanese-Hong Kong film directed by King Hu.

Plot
Ho, a young scholar, is responsible for translating Buddhist sutras which are said to have power over the creatures of the afterlife. He goes to a monastery to fulfill the task. He meets strange people: Mr. Tsui and his friend Chang, Melody a Chinese drum player, an old washerwoman and a flutist.

Cast
Shih Chun as Ho
Hsu Feng as Melody
Sylvia Chang as Cloud
Tung Lam as Mr. Tsui		
Tien Feng as Cheng		
Chen Hui-lou as Reverend
Rainbow Hsu as Ms. Chang 
Wu Jiaxiang as Man carrying wood
Ng Ming Tsui as Lama 
Sun Yueh

Release
Legend of the Mountain was released in 1979. The film was also shown at the 1979 Festival of Festivals in Toronto.

Reception
From contemporary English reviews, Richard Labonte of the Ottawa Citizen described the film as an "intellectual challenge" and as "three hours of film which never drags" and that it was "structured with a rigid formalism which allows for no spontaneity at all and is also a unique treat, for those who can adapt to a slow and mannered Eastern style rather than the fast-paced and action-packed style of most Western films."

Review aggregator website Rotten Tomatoes retrospectively gave the film an approval rating of 100% based on 7 reviews from western critics, and an average rating of 8.3/10.

References

External links 

1979 films
1970s fantasy films
Taiwanese fantasy films
Hong Kong fantasy films
1970s Hong Kong films